The Ladies Open Hechingen (currently sponsored as the boso Ladies Open Hechingen) is a tournament for professional female tennis players played on outdoor clay courts. The event is classified as a $60,000 ITF Women's Circuit tournament and has been held in Hechingen, Germany, since 1999.

Past finals

Singles

Doubles

External links 
  
 ITF search

ITF Women's World Tennis Tour
Recurring sporting events established in 1999
Clay court tennis tournaments
Tennis tournaments in Germany